Robatak or Rabatak may refer to:
 Robatak, Afghanistan
 Robatak, Fars, Iran

See also
Rabatak inscription, a Bactrian inscription found in Robatak, Afghanistan